Frank Page may refer to:
Frank Page (Southern Baptist), former CEO of the Southern Baptist Convention
Frank Page (broadcaster) (1925–2013), radio broadcaster at KWKH in Shreveport, Louisiana
Frank Page (motoring journalist) (1930–2014), British motoring journalist

See also
Francis Page (disambiguation)